Kfar Silver (lit. Silver Village) is a youth village in southern Israel. Located near Ashkelon, the village falls under the jurisdiction of Hof Ashkelon Regional Council.

History
The village was founded in 1957 on the initiative of the Zionist Organization of America, and was named after Abba Hillel Silver. In March 2008 it was hit by a BM-21 fired from the Gaza Strip.
Kfar Silver operates as a boarding school. The founder and first principal of the school was author and educator Aryeh Kotzer.

See also
Education in Israel

References 

Youth villages in Israel
Populated places established in 1957
1957 establishments in Israel
Populated places in Southern District (Israel)
American-Jewish culture in Israel